KXIA (101.1 FM) is a commercial radio station broadcasting a Country radio format. It is licensed to Marshalltown, Iowa, and serves the Des Moines metropolitan area. The station is currently licensed to Trending Media, Inc.

KXIA is powered at 100,000 watts, the maximum for non-grandfathered FM radio stations in the U.S. The transmitter is located near U.S. Route 30 and South 12th Street in Marshalltown.

History
The station first signed on in January 1968 as KFJB-FM. It was simulcast with co-owned AM 1230 KFJB. The two stations were owned by the Marshall Electric Company. KFJB-FM was powered at only 27,500 watts, a quarter of its current effective radiated power (ERP).

References

External links
 

Country radio stations in the United States
XIA
Marshalltown, Iowa